Pre-Pottery Neolithic B (PPNB) is part of the Pre-Pottery Neolithic, a Neolithic culture centered in upper Mesopotamia and the Levant, dating to  years ago, that is, 8800–6500 BC. It was typed by British archaeologist Kathleen Kenyon during her archaeological excavations at Jericho in the West Bank.

Like the earlier PPNA people, the PPNB culture developed from the Mesolithic Natufian culture. However, it shows evidence of a northerly origin, possibly indicating an influx from the region of northeastern Anatolia.

Lifestyle 

Cultural tendencies of this period differ from that of the earlier Pre-Pottery Neolithic A (PPNA) period in that people living during this period began to depend more heavily upon domesticated animals to supplement their earlier mixed agrarian and hunter-gatherer diet. In addition, the flint tool kit of the period is new and quite disparate from that of the earlier period. One of its major elements is the naviform core. This is the first period in which architectural styles of the southern Levant became primarily rectilinear; earlier typical dwellings were circular, elliptical and occasionally even octagonal. Pyrotechnology, the expanding capability to control fire, was highly developed in this period. During this period, one of the main features of houses is a thick layer of white clay plaster flooring, highly polished and made of lime produced from limestone.

It is believed that the use of clay plaster for floor and wall coverings during PPNB led to the discovery of pottery. The earliest proto-pottery was White Ware vessels, made from lime and gray ash, built up around baskets before firing, for several centuries around 7000 BCE at sites such as Tell Neba'a Faour (Beqaa Valley). Sites from this period found in the Levant utilizing rectangular floor plans and plastered floor techniques were found at Ain Ghazal, Yiftahel (western Galilee), and Abu Hureyra (Upper Euphrates). The period is dated to between c. 10,700 and c. 8,000 BP or 7000–6000 BC.

Plastered human skulls were reconstructed human skulls that were made in the ancient Levant between 9000 and 6000 BC in the Pre-Pottery Neolithic B period. They represent some of the oldest forms of art in the Middle East and demonstrate that the prehistoric population took great care in burying their ancestors below their homes. The skulls denote some of the earliest sculptural examples of portraiture in the history of art.

Society 

Danielle Stordeur's recent work at Tell Aswad, a large agricultural village between Mount Hermon and Damascus could not validate Henri de Contenson's earlier suggestion of a PPNA Aswadian culture. Instead, they found evidence of a fully established PPNB culture at 8700 BC at Aswad, pushing back the period's generally accepted start date by 1,200 years. Similar sites to Tell Aswad in the Damascus Basin of the same age were found at Tell Ramad and Tell Ghoraifé. How a PPNB culture could spring up in this location, practicing domesticated farming from 8700 BC has been the subject of speculation. Whether it created its own culture or imported traditions from the North East or Southern Levant has been considered an important question for a site that poses a problem for the scientific community.

Extent 
Work at the site of 'Ain Ghazal in Jordan has indicated a later Pre-Pottery Neolithic C period, which existed between 8,200 and 7,900 BP. Juris Zarins has proposed that a Circum Arabian Nomadic Pastoral Complex developed in the period from the climatic crisis of 6200 BC, partly as a result of an increasing emphasis in PPNB cultures upon animal domesticates, and a fusion with Harifian hunter gatherers in Southern Palestine, with affiliate connections with the cultures of Fayyum and the Eastern Desert of Egypt. Cultures practicing this lifestyle spread down the Red Sea shoreline and moved east from Syria into southern Iraq.

The culture disappeared during the 8.2 kiloyear event, a term that climatologists have adopted for a sudden decrease in global temperatures that occurred approximately 8,200 years before the present, or c. 6200 BC, and which lasted for the next two to four centuries. In the following Munhatta and Yarmukian post-pottery Neolithic cultures that succeeded it, rapid cultural development continues, although PPNB culture continued in the Amuq valley, where it influenced the later development of the Ghassulian culture.

Artifacts 
Around 8000 BCE, before the invention of pottery, several early settlements became experts in crafting beautiful and highly sophisticated containers from stone, using materials such as alabaster or granite, and employing sand to shape and polish. Artisans used the veins in the material to maximum visual effect. Such objects have been found in abundance on the upper Euphrates river, in what is today eastern Syria, especially at the site of Bouqras. These form the early stages of the development of the Art of Mesopotamia.

Genetics 

Pre-Pottery Neolithic B fossils that were analysed for ancient DNA were found to carry the Y-DNA (paternal) haplogroups E1b1b (2/7; ~29%), CT (2/7; ~29%), E(xE2,E1a,E1b1a1a1c2c3b1,E1b1b1b1a1,E1b1b1b2b) (1/7; ~14%), T(xT1a1,T1a2a) (1/7; ~14%), and H2 (1/7; ~14%). The CT clade was also observed in a Pre-Pottery Neolithic C specimen (1/1; 100%). Maternally, the rare basal haplogroup N* has been found among skeletal remains belonging to the Pre-Pottery Neolithic B, as have the mtDNA clades L3 and K.

DNA analysis has also confirmed ancestral ties between the Pre-Pottery Neolithic culture bearers and the makers of the Epipaleolithic Iberomaurusian culture of North Africa, the Mesolithic Natufian culture of the Levant, the Savanna Pastoral Neolithic culture of East Africa, the Early Neolithic Cardium culture of Morocco, and the Ancient Egyptian culture of the Nile Valley, with fossils associated with these early cultures all sharing a common genomic component.

Diffusion

Carbon-14 dating 

The spread of the Neolithic in Europe was first studied quantitatively in the 1970s, when a sufficient number of 14C age determinations for early Neolithic sites had become available. Ammerman and Cavalli-Sforza discovered a linear relationship between the age of an Early Neolithic site and its distance from the conventional source in the Near East (Jericho), thus demonstrating that, on average, the Neolithic spread at a constant speed of about 1 km/yr. More recent studies confirm these results and yield the speed of 0.6–1.3 km/yr at 95% confidence level.

Analysis of mitochondrial DNA 
Since the original human expansions out of Africa 200,000 years ago, different prehistoric and historic migration events have taken place in Europe. Considering that the movement of the people implies a consequent movement of their genes, it is possible to estimate the impact of these migrations through the genetic analysis of human populations. Agricultural and husbandry practices originated 10,000 years ago in a region of the Near East known as the Fertile Crescent. According to the archaeological record this phenomenon, known as "Neolithic", rapidly expanded from these territories into Europe. However, whether this diffusion was accompanied or not by human migrations is greatly debated. Mitochondrial DNA – a type of maternally inherited DNA located in the cell cytoplasm- was recovered from the remains of Pre-Pottery Neolithic B (PPNB) farmers in the Near East and then compared to available data from other Neolithic populations in Europe and also to modern populations from South Eastern Europe and the Near East. The obtained results show that substantial human migrations were involved in the Neolithic spread and suggest that the first Neolithic farmers entered Europe following a maritime route through Cyprus and the Aegean Islands.

Relative chronology

See also 

 Holocene climatic optimum
 Levantine archaeology#Ceramics analysis
 Prehistory of the Levant
 Upper Mesopotamia#Prehistory

References

External links 

 
Neolithic cultures of Asia
Archaeological cultures of the Near East
9th-millennium BC establishments
7th-millennium BC disestablishments
Pre-Pottery Neolithic